
Year 276 (CCLXXVI) was a leap year starting on Saturday (link will display the full calendar) of the Julian calendar. At the time, it was known as the Year of the Consulship of Tacitus and Aemilianus (or, less frequently, year 1029 Ab urbe condita). The denomination 276 for this year has been used since the early medieval period, when the Anno Domini calendar era became the prevalent method in Europe for naming years.

Events 
 By place 
 Roman Empire 
 Emperor Tacitus doubles the silver content of the aurelianianus, and halves its tariffing to 2.5 d.c. They carry the value marks X.I.
 Tacitus campaigns successfully against the Goths who have invaded Asia Minor, and his half-brother, the praetorian prefect Marcus Annius Florianus, continues the campaign. 
 Tacitus' cousin Maximinus administers Syria in a harsh manner, and is assassinated by local men of power, who are joined in the conspiracy by the faction responsible for having assassinated Aurelian in the previous year. 
 Tacitus dies in Tyana, Cappadocia. He either dies of illness, or is murdered by the faction responsible for having assassinated Aurelian and Maximinus.
 Florianus becomes Roman Emperor with the support of the Senate, but a general in the east, Marcus Aurelius Probus, usurps power against him. Florianus breaks off his campaign against the Goths and marches east from the Bosporus with support from the Roman legion's in Britain,  Gaul, Spain and Italy.
 Florianus holds power for some weeks and fights indecisively against Probus in Cilicia, but his soldiers, many of whom are from the colder Rhine and Danube frontiers, suffer from heat and disease. He is overthrown and then assassinated by his own troops near Tarsus (Turkey), in collusion with Probus. Probus, age 44, is proclaimed new Emperor of Rome.
 Probus returns the aurelianianus to the tariffing of Aurelian.
 Probus invites the faction responsible for the murders of Aurelian and Tacitus to a banquet, only to massacre them. He then arrests a surviving conspirator and has him burned alive.

 Sassanid Empire 
 King Bahram I of Persia dies after a 3-year reign, in which the Zoroastrian priests at Ctesiphon (Iran) put pressure on him to persecute Buddhists, Christians, and Manichaeans. He is succeeded by his son Bahram II.

 Asia 
 Mahasena reigns in Ceylon. Orthodox and unpopular, he tries to introduce Mahayana Buddhism to the country.

Births 
 Gregory the Elder, bishop of Nazianzus (approximate date)
 Guo Pu, Chinese historian, poet and writer (d. 324)
 Wang Dao, Chinese politician and statesman (d. 339)
 Yuan of Jin, Chinese emperor of the Jin Dynasty (d. 323)

Deaths 
 Bahram I, king of the Sassanid Empire
 Marcus Annius Florianus, Roman emperor
 Marcus Claudius Tacitus, Roman Emperor
 Tiberius Julius Synges, Roman client king

References